USArray is one of the three components of the Earthscope project [the other two being the Plate Boundary Observatory (PBO) and the San Andreas Fault Observatory at Depth (SAFOD), funded by the National Science Foundation and being constructed, operated, and maintained as a collaborative effort with UNAVCO Inc., the Incorporated Research Institutions for Seismology (IRIS), and Stanford University, with contributions from several other national and international organizations.  A major goal of USArray is to collect detailed seismic images of the North American lithosphere.  The data collected from USArray will be integrated with geologic observations made on the earth's surface to help determine the geologic history of North America, as well as to better understand that geologic processes that are at work today. USArray consists of four "observatories":
 the Transportable Array.
 the Flexible Array
 the Reference Network.
 the Magnetotelluric Array.

The Transportable Array (TA) is a network of 400 high-quality broadband seismographs on temporary sites that is marching across the conterminous United States.  The initial deployment, in August 2007, was in the western quarter of the United States. Since then the stations on the western edge are regularly relocated to the eastern edge at a rate of about four stations per week. The Transportable Array reaches the East Coast in 2013, and will wind up in 2017, having occupied nearly 2000 sites.  The newest stations are listed online.

Geological structures can be mapped by observing how they affect seismic waves from local and distant earthquakes, a process known as seismic tomography.  The density of the TA network — typical station spacing of about 70 km — provides a level of resolution not previously available in many parts of the country, and is providing finer details of the lithosphere under parts of North America.

The Reference Network is an additional 100+ permanent stations located on approximately 300 km spacings that provide a long-term reference frame. These also augment the USGS Advanced National Seismic System (ANSS), providing seismic observations in areas where instrumentation has been lacking.

The Flexible Array is a pool of portable seismic instruments available for short-term high-density observations of particular areas of interest.

The Magnetotelluric Array measures naturally occurring electric and magnetic fields.  It consists of seven permanent magnetotelluric (MT) stations and twenty portable stations.

Data from these instruments is available at the IRIS Data Management Center.

See also
Array Network Facility

References

Seismological observatories, organisations and projects